Destiny is the seventh studio album by Filipina singer-actress Jolina Magdangal under GMA Records. "Will of the Wind" is the lead single and used as the main theme song of the movie I.T.A.L.Y.(I trust and love you). Other songs from this album was also used as a theme song to some of GMA Network TV series like Filipino adaptation of koreanovela All about Eve and koreanovela The Legend. A cover of Fra Lippo Lippi (band)'s Stitches & Burns is also included in this album.

Track listing

Personnel
Adapted from the Jolina liner notes.

 Felipe S. Yalong – executive producer
 Rene A. Salta – executive producer
 Alwyn B. Cruz – producer
 Marc Tupaz – producer
 Shamrock – arrangement and performance for the songs "Umibig Ka" and "Isang Taon"
 Christopher San Diego – recording and mixing engineer, gma network recording studios
 Arnold Jallores – recording and mixing engineer, mixsonic recording studios
 Jun Magdangal – album cover concept
 Joseph De Vera – album cover concept, album cover design
 Eileen Ramos – make-up
 Reggie Cruz – stylist
 Dominique James – photographer, great image (front cover)
 Dail Deri – photographer, gallery d (inside & back cover)

References

2006 albums
Jolina Magdangal albums
GMA Music albums